The Second Doctor is an incarnation of the Doctor, the protagonist of the BBC science fiction television series Doctor Who. He was portrayed by actor Patrick Troughton. While the Troughton era of Doctor Who is well-remembered by fans and in that era's Doctor Who literature, it is difficult to appraise in full; of his 119 episodes, 53 remain missing.

Within the series' narrative, the Doctor is a centuries-old alien Time Lord from the planet Gallifrey who travels in time and space in the TARDIS, frequently with companions. At the end of life, the Doctor regenerates; as a result, the physical appearance and personality of the Doctor changes. The transformation into the Second Doctor (originally referred to as a "renewal"), a figure who was the same 'essential' character as the first but with a very different persona, was a turning point in the evolution of the series, and eventually became a critical element of the series' longevity.

Troughton's Doctor was an outwardly scruffy, light hearted and bumbling tramp, a portrayal that was nicknamed the Cosmic Hobo. He hid a more firm and slightly darker side that he would often use to manipulate his enemies and allies for the greater good. His original "swinging sixties" companions were the sophisticated socialite Polly (Anneke Wills) and working class sailor Ben Jackson (Michael Craze), who had travelled with his previous incarnation. They were later joined by 18th century Jacobite Jamie McCrimmon (Frazer Hines), who would become the Second Doctor's most loyal and trusted companion. Following Ben and Polly's departures, the Doctor and Jamie were joined by the Victorian orphan Victoria Waterfield (Deborah Watling) and 21st century astrophysicist Zoe Heriot (Wendy Padbury). Jamie and Zoe stayed with the Second Doctor until the Time Lords sent them back to their own times, with their memories of all but their first encounter with him wiped.

Biography
The First Doctor grew progressively weaker while battling the Cybermen during the events of The Tenth Planet (1966) and eventually collapsed, seemingly from old age. His body renewed itself and transformed into the Second Doctor.

Initially, the relationship between the Second Doctor and his predecessor was unclear. In his first story, the Second Doctor referred to his predecessor in the third person as if he were a completely different person. His companions Ben and Polly are at first unsure how to treat him, though Polly is willing to believe he is the same man, and it is only when a Dalek recognises the Doctor that Ben accepts that he is the Doctor. This all occurred during the new Doctor's first story, The Power of the Daleks (1966).

In the second story, The Highlanders (1966–67), Jamie McCrimmon joined the TARDIS crew, and remained with the Second Doctor for the rest of his travels. At the conclusion of The Faceless Ones (1967), Ben and Polly left together when the TARDIS landed at Gatwick Airport on the same day they originally left with the First Doctor, after they had stopped the mass kidnapping of tourists by shape shifting aliens. In the following story The Evil of the Daleks (1967), the Doctor and Jamie became involved in a plot by the Daleks to gain both the "Human and Dalek Factors" when the TARDIS was stolen, which led to them meeting Victoria Waterfield in the 19th century. The Doctor used the situation to engineer a Dalek civil war that seemingly destroyed the Daleks forever. However, Victoria's father was among the casualties. Now an orphan, Victoria chose to accompany the Doctor and Jamie on their travels. Although she felt great affection for the Doctor and Jamie, she was never able to completely come to terms with life in the TARDIS and the constant danger that resulted. She eventually chose to leave after the events of Fury from the Deep (1968) and was adopted by Mr. and Mrs. Harris in the 20th Century. After the events of The Wheel in Space (1968), the Doctor and Jamie were then joined by Zoe Heriot, an extremely intelligent woman from the 21st century, who helped defeat the Cybermen attack on a space station known as the Wheel. She then stowed away in the TARDIS and, despite the Doctor's warnings about what she might encounter, chose to remain.

During his second incarnation, the Doctor confronted familiar foes such as the Daleks and the Cybermen, as well as new enemies such as the Great Intelligence and the Ice Warriors. It was during The Web of Fear (1968) that he first met Colonel Alistair Gordon Lethbridge-Stewart, in the tunnels of the London Underground. Following the defeat of the Great Intelligence, Lethbridge-Stewart was promoted to Brigadier and became the leader of the British contingent of UNIT, a military organisation tasked to investigate and defend the world from extraterrestrial threats. In The Invasion (1968), the Doctor reteamed with him to defeat an invasion of Cybermen in league with industrialist Tobias Vaughan.

In his final story The War Games (1969), the Second Doctor's time came to an end when the TARDIS landed in the middle of a warzone, created by a race of alien warlords who, with the help of another renegade Time Lord the War Chief, progressively kidnapped and brainwashed humans into becoming soldiers for them, hoping to use the ones who survived to conquer the Galaxy. Although the Doctor was able to defeat their plan, he realised he would be unable to return the human subjects to their various original points in Earth's history. He therefore contacted the Time Lords, sacrificing his own freedom in the process, and despite an attempt to escape was forced to return to his home planet. He was then put on trial by the Time Lords, for breaking their laws of non-interference. Despite the Doctor's argument that the Time Lords should use their great powers to help others, he was sentenced to exile on 20th century Earth, the Time Lords forcing his regeneration into the Third Doctor in the process. Jamie and Zoe were returned to their own time, with their memories of all but their first encounter with the Doctor wiped and the secret of the TARDIS was also taken from the Doctor.

Season 6B
Due to what would appear to be continuity errors in Troughton's later appearances (particularly in The Two Doctors), some fans have speculated that the Time Lords used the Second Doctor as an agent after the events of The War Games (1969), and that he did not in fact immediately regenerate and enter his exile on Earth. This theory of continuity is described as "Season 6B".  Additionally, while The War Games never depicted the Doctor's regeneration itself, it was later depicted in TV Comic, which treated the exiled Doctor's exploits on Earth, before, in a comic entitled The Nightwalkers, showing the Doctor dragged in to the TARDIS by animated scarecrows, allowing his change of appearance to take place. The Second Doctor's regeneration was also depicted in Devious, a fan-produced film starring Jon Pertwee in his last appearance as the Third Doctor.

According to script editor Robert Holmes, the Second Doctor's missions for the Time Lords took place prior to the events of The War Games: "they 'framed' the Troughton Doctor and got him to do various things for them, and then hauled him up in front of them on trial.

Personality
The Second Doctor has been nicknamed the "Cosmic Hobo", as the impish Second Doctor appeared to be far more scruffy and childlike than his first incarnation.

Mercurial, clever, and always a few steps ahead of his enemies, at times he could be a calculating schemer who would not only manipulate people for the greater good but act like a bumbling fool to have others underestimate his true abilities. One example is in The Tomb of the Cybermen (1967), where, despite his admonitions not to open the titular tomb, he corrects evil logician Eric Klieg's calculations of the code to open the tomb behind Klieg's back. This allows the tomb to be opened, so that the Doctor can expose Klieg and the Cybermens' respective plans and defeat both.

Sometimes his manipulation of those around him can veer into dark territory. In The Evil of the Daleks (1967), he coldly manipulates Jamie into trying to rescue Victoria (thus setting in motion the Human Factor tests) and is unsympathetic when Edward Waterfield tries to apologise for his collaboration with the Daleks.  Later in the story he appears to have been converted by the "Dalek factor" into a mental Dalek, although he eventually reveals this to be a pretence.  In The Enemy of the World (1968)  while impersonating villain Salamander who is his doppelganger, he interrogates Jamie and Victoria without their knowing that it is really himself, provoking them until they nearly physically attack him.  In the following story The Web of Fear he apparently reconciles to the Great Intelligence's plan to drain his mind and resists rescue attempts - only afterwards does it emerge that he planned to reverse to mind-drain.  Despite the bluster and tendency to panic when events got out of control, the Second Doctor always acted heroically and morally in his desire to help the oppressed.

This Doctor is associated with the catchphrases "When I say run, run!", and  "Oh my giddy aunt!" (although the latter is only first heard in one of his last few stories, The Krotons) and is noted for playing the recorder.

Appearance

Troughton's costume was the result from discussion between the actor himself, producer Innes Lloyd, and script-editor Gerry Davis. He wore a black frock coat, several sizes too big, over a light blue-coloured, button-down collar shirt. The top button was undone, but the top of the shirt was held with a safety pin attached to a Winston Churchill style bow-tie. He wore very baggy trousers, which, were held up by red braces with stars, moons and flowers, or white braces with a navy stripe down the middle.  In his first two stories, the trousers were orange and black two-inch check, later he wore brown houndstooth trousers.  He also tended to wear a stovepipe hat and dark brown dress boots.  The actor denied suggestions that his distinctive mop of jet black hair was a wig.

In stories set in colder environments, Troughton wore a cloak (The Highlanders, The Tomb of the Cybermen) or a short fur coat (The Abominable Snowmen, The Five Doctors).

Story style

With the arrival of a younger Doctor and changing tastes, the Second Doctor's tenure was characterised by a faster pace and a preference toward "monster of the week"-style horror stories, whilst the purely historical adventures that were a recurring feature of the Hartnell era ceased with The Highlanders, the only Troughton-era entry in that genre. While Troughton's Doctor would still visit the Earth's past, he would always encounter an alien, such as the Daleks or the Ice Warriors. It was also during this era that Doctor Who began to come under fire for its purportedly violent and frightening content.

As with his predecessor, all the Second Doctor's original episodes were in black-and-white. Later guest appearances in The Three Doctors (1972–73), The Five Doctors (1983) and The Two Doctors (1985) were in colour. However, Troughton's reign as the Doctor was more notable for what does not exist than for what does, as many of the episodes featuring the Second Doctor were junked by the BBC; a full list of incomplete Doctor Who serials shows how many of these episodes are missing from the BBC Archives.

Only two stories in Troughton's first two seasons – The Tomb of the Cybermen (1967) and The Enemy of the World (1968) – still exist in their entirety; ten stories only exist partially (most with one or two episodes out of 4 or 6); and four are lost in their entirety: his first story, The Power of the Daleks (1966); Jamie's first adventure, The Highlanders (1966–67); The Macra Terror (1967); and Victoria's last adventure, Fury From the Deep (1968).

Later appearances

The Second Doctor would return to the series on three occasions: in 1973 for the 10th anniversary serial The Three Doctors (which also saw the return of William Hartnell as the First Doctor), in 1983 for the 20th anniversary special, The Five Doctors, and once more in 1985 in The Two Doctors.

Other mentions
Images of the Second Doctor appear in Day of the Daleks (1972), The Brain of Morbius (1976), Earthshock (1982), Mawdryn Undead (1983), Resurrection of the Daleks (1984), "Human Nature" (2007), "The Next Doctor" (2008), "The Eleventh Hour" (2010), "Vincent and the Doctor" (2010), "The Lodger" (2010), "Nightmare in Silver" (2013), and The Sarah Jane Adventures story Death of the Doctor (2010), and "The Husbands of River Song" (2015).

A sculpture of his head, along with that of the First Doctor, appears in the 1993 special for Children in Need titled Dimensions in Time (1993).  The Fourth Doctor calls him "the flautist."

He briefly appears in "The Name of the Doctor" (2013), where archive footage from The Five Doctors is used to show him running past Clara Oswald in an unseen adventure.

The Second Doctor appears, via archival images, in the series' 50th anniversary special, "The Day of the Doctor" (2013). He is seen piloting the TARDIS and acting in unison with twelve other incarnations of the Doctor to save Gallifrey on the final day of the Time War.

Reception
Troughton received a mixed reception from viewers at first; letters sent to the Radio Times both praised "the superb character he has created" and criticised "a wonderful series" for turning into "what looked like Coco the Clown".

Peter Davison, Colin Baker, Sylvester McCoy and Matt Smith, who portrayed the Fifth, Sixth, Seventh and Eleventh Doctors, respectively, have stated that the Second Doctor is their favourite. Smith has also stated that his Doctor costume, in particular the bow-tie, was also influenced by the Second Doctor's, citing the story The Tomb of the Cybermen as a favourite story.

Other appearances

References

External links

 The Second Doctor on the BBC's Doctor Who website
 Second Doctor Gallery
 Second Doctor's theme music  QuickTime file
 Second Doctor title sequence

02
02
Male characters in television
Television characters introduced in 1966